MV Treasure may refer to:
  (1983–2000;   ) – cargo ship that sank off the coast of South Africa in 2000 – see MV Treasure oil spill
  (1990–;   ) – heavy load carrier
  (1942–1969) – the Empire ship Treasure – see List of Empire ships (Th–Ty)

Ship names